Truthy may refer to:

Truthiness
The truth value of an expression when evaluated as a Boolean data type, for example in